The Port-au-Prince Haiti Temple is a temple of the Church of Jesus Christ of Latter-day Saints (LDS Church) in the Port-au-Prince suburb of Pétionville, Haiti.  It is located adjacent to an existing meetinghouse at the intersection of Route de Frères (Delmas 105) and Impasse Saint-Marc (Frères 23).

History
The intent to construct the temple was announced by church president Thomas S. Monson on April 5, 2015, during the Sunday morning session of the church's general conference. The Abidjan Ivory Coast and Bangkok Thailand temples were announced at the same time.

At a stake conference in Port-au-Prince on March 12, 2017, apostle Neil L. Andersen announced that a location for the temple had been selected and acquired. On October 28, 2017, a groundbreaking ceremony to signify the beginning of construction took place, with Walter F. González presiding.

In August 2018, the LDS Church announced that Fritzner A. Joseph, a former president of the Haiti Port-au-Prince Mission, would serve as the temple's first president following its dedication.

On November 14, 2018, the LDS Church originally announced that the temple was scheduled for dedication on May 19, 2019.  On January 18, 2019, the church provided new dates, announcing the public open house that was held from August 3 through August 17, 2019, excluding Sundays. The temple was dedicated on September 1, 2019 by David A. Bednar.

In 2020, like all the church's other temples, the Port-au-Prince Haiti Temple was closed temporarily during the year in response to the coronavirus pandemic.

Temple district
At the time of its dedication, the temple district includes the five stakes and four districts in Haiti, in which approximately 24,000 members reside.

See also

 The Church of Jesus Christ of Latter-day Saints in Haiti
 Comparison of temples of The Church of Jesus Christ of Latter-day Saints
 List of temples of The Church of Jesus Christ of Latter-day Saints
 List of temples of The Church of Jesus Christ of Latter-day Saints by geographic region
 Temple architecture (Latter-day Saints)
 Religion in Haiti - The Church of Jesus Christ of Latter-day Saints

References

External links
Port-au-Prince Haiti Temple Official site
Port-au-Prince Haiti Temple at ChurchofJesusChristTemples.org

Temples (LDS Church) in North America
Temples (LDS Church) completed in 2019
Religious buildings and structures in Haiti
Buildings and structures in Port-au-Prince
Buildings and structures in Haiti
Temples (LDS Church) in Latin America
The Church of Jesus Christ of Latter-day Saints in the Caribbean
21st-century Latter Day Saint temples